The Frank Booth House, at 1608 Seventeenth Ave. in Lewiston, Idaho, was built in 1907.  It was listed on the National Register of Historic Places in 1994.

It is a one-and-a-half-story Colonial Revival-style house, the last of nine houses to be built in the Blanchard Heights development.  The development was originally surrounded by open fields, and the houses were scattered over a 16-block (then or later?) area which later was developed, post-World War II, as a suburb.  The house is on a steep slope, facing north over Lewiston and the Clearwater River and its valley.

The house was designed by Lewiston architect James Nave, and it was built by Frank Booth, a local contractor.

References

National Register of Historic Places in Nez Perce County, Idaho
Colonial Revival architecture in Idaho
Houses completed in 1907